When the Second Sino-Japanese War broke out between China and Japan in 1937, Peking University, Tsinghua University and Nankai University merged to form Changsha Temporary University in Changsha and later National Southwestern Associated University  (Lianda) in Kunming and Mengzi, in Southwest China's Yunnan Province. After the war, the universities moved back and resumed their operation. What was left behind in Kunming became the National Kunming Normal University which later emerged as the Yunnan Normal University.

History 

By summer 1937, the Imperial Japanese Army had bombed Nankai University to the ground in Tianjin and occupied areas including the campuses of two of the country's leading universities in Beijing: Peking University and Tsinghua University. These three universities, which were some of the country's most prestigious, modern institutions of higher learning and research, with the agreement of those who led the institutions — men of high standing who had been educated abroad — retreated to Changsha, the capital city of Hunan province (about 900 miles away from Beijing) to unite. By the middle of December 1937, many students had to leave to fight the Japanese when the city of Nanjing fell to enemy forces.

As the Japanese forces were gaining more territory, they bombed Changsha in February 1938. The 800 staff faculty and students who were left had to flee and made the 1,000 mile journey to Kunming, capital of Yunnan province in China's remote and mountainous southwest. It was here that the National Southwest Associated University (commonly known as 'Lianda') was formed. In these extraordinary wartime circumstances for eight years, staff, professors and students had to survive and operate in makeshift quarters that were subjected to sporadic bombing campaigns by the Imperial Japanese forces. There were dire shortages of food, equipment, books, clothing and other essential needs, but they managed to conduct the running of a modern university. Over those years of war (1937-1945), Lianda became famous nationwide for having and producing many of China's most prominent scientists and intellectuals, including the Nobel Prize laureates Yang Chen-Ning and Tsung-Dao Lee.

Aftermath 
When the war ended with victory over the Japanese, the Lianda community, which had entered the war fiercely loyal to the government of Chiang Kai-shek, emerged in 1946 as a bastion of criticism of China’s ruling Kuomintang party. Within three years, the majority of the Lianda community had returned to their north China campuses in Beijing and Tianjin.

See also 

 List of universities in Yunnan
 History of education in China
 Higher education in China
 Education in the People's Republic of China
 Education in the Republic of China

References 

 John Israel. Lianda: A Chinese University in War and Revolution (1999) Stanford University Press. .

External links 
 

 
Defunct universities and colleges in China
Educational institutions established in 1937
Universities and colleges in Kunming
Major National Historical and Cultural Sites in Yunnan
1937 establishments in China